Slušaj mater (English: "Listen to your mother") was Edo Maajka's debut album and achieved significant popularity, especially in Bosnia. It was the first rap album to win the Davorin music award for best album of the year in that region.

Overview
In Edo's debut album, he addresses subjects ranging from bloody revenge in the song Saletova Osveta ("Sale's Revenge") to tragic love in Mahir i Alma ("Mahir and Alma"). He also talks about exceptional soldiers in the Yugoslav wars and the black market in the song Šverc Komerc ("Smuggling Commerce"). Pare, Pare ("Money, Money" ) is a song about being rich and having everything. In the song Znaš Me ("You Know Me"), Edo talks about his dislike of drugs, politics, and government. He talks about drug dealers and how he hates them, to the point where he kills two drug dealers in the song. He also raps about the paranormal in the song Prikaze ("Apparitions"), which is about how some creatures are in his dreams and haunt him, and In the song Jesmo'l Sami ("Are We Alone"), he talks about aliens and how they might live compared to us.

Production
This album was produced mainly by Dash with the help of Shot and Koolade. All songs were recorded by Mladen Malek in studio 25. Mix is by Silvio Pasarić in Studio Morris, with additional mixing by Shot and Koolade in Studio 25. The mastering was done by Miro Vidović in Studio Morris. The cover was done by EdoAlmin Chel and logo by Filip Tattoos. It was all released on the MenArt label and Fm Jam records.

Reception
The album received overwhelming praise from critics. It is stated as the hip hop album that broke boundaries in the Balkan hip hop scene (including Bosnia, Croatia and Serbia). Edo began being called pop version of hip hop. Edo was overwhelmingly praised for his lyrics, and for interesting and original songs which include Prikaze, Jesmo'l sami, and De-ža-vu. With these songs, Edo hit territory that no other rapper had crossed before. With this album, Edo Maajka became a hot spot for interviews and analysis.

Track listing

References

Edo Maajka albums
2002 debut albums